Sergey Zagraevsky (August 20, 1964 – 6 July 2020) was a Russian-Israeli painter, architectural historian, writer and theologian.

Biography 

Zagraevsky was the son of architectural historian Wolfgang Kawelmacher (1933–2004) and poet and dramatist Inna Zagraevsky (born 1933).

He began to paint at school and his first teacher was the Russian painter Tatiana Mavrina.

Between 2002 and 2005 Zagraevsky taught at the Moscow Institute of Restoration Arts, and subsequently at the Russian University of Intellectual Property and in the Vladimir-Souzdal Museum. The main themes of his architectural history research are ancient Russian white-stone buildings, the early architecture of Moscow and architectural connections between ancient Russia and Romano-Gothic Europe. His doctoral thesis was "North-Eastern Russian architecture from the end of 13th – first third of the 14th century".

Zagraevsky was the chief editor of the reference work "United Art Rating" and the author of a number of books on philosophy, theology and the history of architecture. He has written a number of children's stories and many articles of art criticism. He was the founder and curator of "RusArch" – the electronic scientific library on History of Old Russian architecture.

In 1992 he became a PhD of technique, received his doctorate in architecture in 2004, then became a Professor in 2005. Zagraevsky was also a full member of Russian art critics Academy (since 2001), the AICA (since 2004), and the Writers union of Russia (since 2001), an Honored culture worker of Russia (since 2009), a member of Russian Academy of Arts (since 2013).

Spoke Russian, English, Hebrew, German, French, Esperanto.

Zagraevsky died on July 6, 2020 due to an acute cardiovascular failure.

Art

Zagraevsky's art does not belong to the classic primitive or naïve schools, since neither the formal nor actual parameters of primitive art are met. Instead, his style was best described as "primitivism", a genre which includes the "primitive" paintings of many artists who had an academic apprenticeship and extensive experience in other styles such as Paul Gauguin, Mikhail Larionov, Pablo Picasso and Paul Klee. 
There are some differences in Zagraevsky's style; his landscape paintings are  "childish" in using a reverse perspective, the absence of chiaroscuro and the relatively accurate portrayal of parts. Zagraevsky uses predominantly open colours giving his paintings brightness comparable to children's painting. His paintings contain neither humour nor violence as these are not normally seen in the art of children.

Since about 2000, Zagraevsky's works became slightly more generalized and varied while retaining their brightness. Details are drawn less carefully although the works remain "childish", with the hand of an experienced artist visible only in the stability of the stroke, the virtuoso technique of painting and drawing, and the compositional and the color balance. There remain recurring features in his art such as a "flattened" sun, squat trees with huge roots, multi-colored water, "album-styled" flowers and illuminated windows.

In the 1990s Bulat Okudzhava wrote of Zagraevsky:

When he moves on a picture his fist,
God is at his assist.
God is with him all his way.
That is the painter Sergey.

Sample works

Selected books

History of architecture 
 Jury Dolgoruky and ancient Russian white stone architecture (Russian: Юрий Долгорукий и древнерусское белокаменное зодчество. М., 2001.) .
 Architecture of North-Eastern Russia at the end of XIII–early XIV c. (Russian: Зодчество Северо-Восточной Руси конца XIII-первой трети XIV века.  M., 2003.) .
 Early Post-Mongolian North-Eastern Russian architecture. (Russian: О раннем послемонгольском зодчестве Северо-Восточной Руси. М., 2002. ) .
 New researches of Vladimir-Suzdal museum’s architectural monuments (Russian: Новые исследования памятников архитектуры Владимиро-Суздальского музея-заповедника. М., 2008.) .
 New research into the architectural monuments of Alexandrov Sloboda (Russian: Новые исследования памятников архитектуры Александровской слободы. М., 2008.)  .
 Architectural history of Trifon in Naprudnoye Church and the origin of the cross-like ceiling.  (Russian: Архитектурная история церкви Трифона в Напрудном и происхождение крещатого свода. M., 2008.) .
 Georgievsky Cathedral in Juriev-Polsky. Questions of architectural history and reconstruction (Russian: Вопросы архитектурной истории и реконструкции Георгиевского собора в Юрьеве-Польском. M., 2008.) .
 Savior Cathedral in Andronikov Cloister. Questions of architectural history and reconstruction (Russian: Вопросы архитектурной истории собора Спаса Нерукотворного Андроникова монастыря. M., 2008.) .
 Forms of the domes of ancient Russian temples (Формы глав (купольных покрытий) древнерусских храмов. М., 2008.) .

Theology 
 Jesus of Nazareth: life and teaching (Russian: Иисус из Назарета: жизнь и учение. М., 2000) .
 God is no murderer (Russian: Бог не убийца. М., 2002.) .
 New Christian philosophy (Russian: Новая христианская философия. М., 2004.) .

Literature 
 Twelve months. Book for children (Russian: Двенадцать месяцев (книга для детей). М., 1998.)
 My XX century. Memoirs (Russian: Мой ХХ век (мемуары). М., 2001.) .
 Ivanushka in the Land of tales (Russian: Иванушка в стране сказок (трилогия). М., 2005.) .

Catalogues of Zagraevsky's art works 
 Сергей Заграевский / Sergey Zagraevsky. — М., 1998.
 Сергей Заграевский / Sergey Zagraevsky. — М., 2007.

Notes

References 
 Sergey Zagraevsky's official website
 Zagraevsky's books in the library "Russian archeology" (in Russian): 
 About Zagraevsky on the web-site of Russian department of AICA (in Russian): 
 About Zagraevsky on the web-site "Russian archeology" (in Russian): 
 About Zagraevsky on the web-site "Russian scientists" (in Russian): 
Zagraevsky on Russian Art critics academy's website: (in Russian)
 About Zagraevsky on the web-site of Moscow writers organization of Russian union of writers: 
 About Zagraevsky on the web-site of gallery "Gallart": 
 Zagraevsky's art
 About Zagraevsky's death (in Russian) 

1964 births
2020 deaths
20th-century Russian painters
Russian male painters
21st-century Russian painters
Israeli painters
Russian emigrants to Israel
Israeli art critics
Israeli historians
Jewish painters
Jewish philosophers
Naïve painters
Landscape artists
21st-century Russian historians
Russian Jews
Russian writers
Russian memoirists
Russian art critics
Christian philosophers
Russian philosophers
Christian theologians
20th-century Russian male artists
21st-century Russian male artists